Smith's blind skink (Dibamus smithi) is a species of legless lizard in the family Dibamidae. The species is endemic to Vietnam.

Etymology
The specific name, smithi, is in honor of British herpetologist Malcolm Arthur Smith.

Geographic range
D. smithi is found in central Vietnam.

Habitat

Reproduction
D. smithi is oviparous.

References

Further reading
Greer AE (1985). "The Relationships of the Lizard Genera Anelytropsis and Dibamus ". Journal of Herpetology 19 (1): 116–156. (Dibamus smithi, new species).
Nguyen VS, Ho TC, Nguyen QT (2009). Herpetofauna of Vietnam. Frankfurt am Main, Germany: Chimaira / Serpents Tale. 768 pp. .

Dibamus
Reptiles of Vietnam
Reptiles described in 1985